I. Magnin & Company was a San Francisco, California-based high fashion and specialty goods luxury department store. Over the course of its existence, it expanded across the West into Southern California and the adjoining states of Arizona, Oregon, and Washington. In the 1970s, under Federated Department Stores ownership, the chain entered the Chicago, Illinois, and Washington, DC, metropolitan areas. Mary Ann Magnin founded the company in 1876 and named the chain after her husband Isaac.

History

Beginnings

In the early 1870s, Dutch-born Mary Ann Magnin and her husband Isaac Magnin left England and settled in San Francisco.  Mary Ann opened a shop in 1876 selling lotions and high-end clothing for infants.  Later, she expanded into bridal wear.  As her business grew, her exclusive clientele relied on her for the newest fashions from Paris.  I. Magnin imported clothing by major designers including Jeanne Lanvin, Hattie Carnegie, and Christian Dior.

At the turn of the century, Mary Ann’s four sons entered the business.  While John Magnin, Grover Magnin, and Sam Magnin became associated with the I. Magnin store, the fourth son, Joseph Magnin, became known for his own store (Joseph Magnin Co.).

The 1906 earthquake and fire leveled the San Francisco store with the remainder of the downtown area.  The store reopened in new quarters at 50 Grant Avenue at Geary Boulevard in 1912. During the 1910s, the chain opened shops in six high-end hotels in California. The Los Angeles Wilshire Boulevard branch (opened in 1939) and the Union Square store (opened in 1948) were among the most elegant in America. When designer Christian Dior visited, he toured the Union Square store, and called it the "White Marble Palace".

In Los Angeles
Daughter Flora married Myer Siegel, who launched a namesake department store in Los Angeles, which would later become a chain. In Los Angeles in 1897 and 1898, I. Magnin & Co. advertised its wares for retail sale at 237 S. Spring St., noting that Mr. Myer Siegel was the manager. The I. Magnin store that Siegel managed moved to 251 S. Broadway on January 2, 1899; on June 19, 1904, I. Magnin announced that the Los Angeles store would henceforth be known as "Myer Siegel". I. Magnin would return with its own Los Angeles-area retail store later when it opened boutiques in the Maryland Hotel in Pasadena and the Ambassador Hotel in Mid-Wilshire, Los Angeles, a branch at 6340 Hollywood Boulevard, and in 1939 a landmark store at 3240 Wilshire Boulevard near Bullocks Wilshire, designed by Myron Hunt, architect of the Ambassador Hotel.

Sale to Bullock's
In 1944, the chain was bought by the Los Angeles-based Bullock's department store chain.  In the late 1950s the combined chain expanded into the Southern California suburbs by opening the Fashion Square concept in Santa Ana in 1958, the San Fernando Valley (Sherman Oaks) in 1962 and Del Amo (Torrance) in 1965.

After a major proxy battle in 1964, Bullocks-I. Magnin was merged into Federated Department Stores.  Bullock's, I. Magnin, and eventually Bullocks Wilshire were run as separate divisions of Federated.  I. Magnin expanded in the Chicago and Washington, D.C. areas in the 1970s.

Sale to Macy's
R.H. Macy & Company had long yearned in the 1980s to enter the Southern California market.  Along with trying to build their own stores, they attempted to purchase Federated, eventually losing a takeover war to the Campeau Corporation in 1988.  As part of the settlement with Campeau, Macy's purchased Bullock's, Bullock's Wilshire and I. Magnin, subsequently beginning a reorganization of its divisions and consolidating the I. Magnin and Bullock's Wilshire stores into a semi-autonomous division under Macy's California.  The seven Bullock's Wilshire stores were renamed I. Magnin in 1989.

In 1991 Macy's announced plans to re-align its divisional structure and created a new Macy's West/Bullock's division by February 1992. While in the process of doing so, it declared bankruptcy on January 27, 1992. During the next two years, the I. Magnin group shuttered 11 stores of an already-reduced franchise with the historic original Bullock's Wilshire flagship on Wilshire Boulevard closed in early 1993 after years of losses aggravated by the effects of the 1992 Rodney King riots.  The Oakland, California, store was closed in 1995.

Liquidation
In 1994 Federated Department Stores reached an agreement with R.H. Macy's creditors to buy the company out of bankruptcy, completing the acquisition on December 19 and making Macy's West/Bullock's a division of Federated. Even before the acquisition closed, it pulled the plug on the remainder of the I. Magnin chain, eventually selling four stores (Carmel, Beverly Hills, San Diego, and Phoenix) to Saks Fifth Avenue and ultimately converting six former I. Magnin locations in Palo Alto, Walnut Creek, Woodland Hills, Palm Desert, Newport Beach, and Palos Verdes to specialty Macy's or Bullock's locations, replicating the success of the 1991 conversion of I. Magnin at South Coast Plaza in Costa Mesa, California, into a separate Bullock's Men's location. The upper floors of the former I. Magnin store on Union Square were later converted to an expansion of Macy's West's own adjoining flagship.

Stores

See also 

 I. Magnin Building

References
 
 
 
 

1876 establishments in California
1994 disestablishments in California
American companies established in 1876
Companies based in San Francisco
Defunct department stores based in the San Francisco Bay Area
Retail companies disestablished in 1994
Retail companies established in 1876
Companies that filed for Chapter 11 bankruptcy in 1992
Union Square, San Francisco
Macy's
Bullock's